Imberg (8th-century – d. before 744) was a Duchess consort of Asti by marriage to Theodon, and duchess regent of Asti after the death of her son.

She was the daughter of Ansprand and the sister of Liutprand, King of the Lombards. Her father, who was Duke of Asti prior to becoming king, arranged a marriage between Imberg and Theodon of Asti, and appointed his son-in-law as duke of Asti. She was widowed at an unknown date. At this point, her brother Liutprand hade become king, and he allowed for his sister's son Ansulf to become duke. Her son, however, died on an unknown date after a short rule. No longer having a son, Imberg was allowed by her brother the king to become duchess regnant of Asti herself. However, there is no documentation preserved of her reign, nor are there dates of her birth, death or accession. It is known that she was dead by the time her brother died in 744, as Aliprand was appointed Duke of Asti in that year.

References 

8th-century Italian women
8th-century births
8th-century deaths
8th-century women rulers